Igliauka is a village in Marijampolė municipality, Lithuania.

The village has a library, a post office (ZIP code: 69005).

Name origins 
Ilgiliauka village stands near a lake Ygla. There is a stream Yglė flowing from the lake through the village. Igliauka village got the name from the lake and earlier its inhabitants were calling it Ygliai village.

References 

Villages in Marijampolė County